Queen Bee (stylized in all caps) are a Japanese rock band, formed in Kobe on March 31, 2009.

Within 2009 the band recorded and, at the beginning of 2010, self-released an extended play record on CD-R through their own  label, followed by another the same year, which they sold at their performances. In 2011 they had their first album, Witch Hunt, professionally manufactured and distributed. Later the same year they signed a major label contract, making Ziyoou Record a sub-label of Sony Music Associated Records. They have since released six full-length major-label albums and their music has been featured in the films Love Strikes!, Sadako and Tokyo Ghoul 'S' and the television programs Spooky Romantics, Tokyo Ghoul:re, Dororo and Chainsaw Man.

Members 
All members of Queen Bee work under pseudonyms and such personal details as their age, family and educational background are not officially stated, though have sometimes been alluded to in passing by members or addressed in their songs' lyrics.

Current members 
  – lead vocals, second guitar (2009–present)

  – bass guitar (2009–present)
 Full pseudonym .
 Reported to be Avu-chan's best friend.

  – drums (2009–present)
 Full pseudonym .
 Reported to be Avu-chan's real sister.

  – lead guitar (2015–present)

Past members 
 Yūki-chan – lead guitar (2009)
  – lead guitar (2009–2012)
 Full pseudonym .

Discography

Studio albums

Extended plays

Singles

Promotional singles

Guest appearances

Videos

Video albums

Music videos

Bibliography

Acting performances 
 
 The band appear as themselves.

 
 Avu-chan played Columbia and the other band members played in the ensemble.

Notes

References

External links 
  
 Queen Bee overview at JaME U.S.A.
 Queen Bee discography at MusicBrainz

2009 establishments in Japan
Dance-rock musical groups
Disco groups
Japanese punk rock groups
Musical groups established in 2009
Musical groups from Hyōgo Prefecture
Sibling musical groups
Sony Music Entertainment Japan artists